The Women's 100 metre freestyle competition of the 2022 European Aquatics Championships was held on 11 and 12 August 2022.

Records
Prior to the competition, the existing world, European and championship records were as follows.

Results

Heats
The heats were started on 11 August at 09:15.

Semifinals
The semifinals were started on 11 August at 18:07.

Final
The final was held at 18:12.

References

External links

Women's 100 metre freestyle